Robert Howard "Bob" McClelland (born November 2, 1933) is a former broadcaster, journalist and political figure in British Columbia. He represented Langley in the Legislative Assembly of British Columbia from 1972 to 1986 as a Social Credit member.

Early life and career 
He was born and educated in Calgary, Alberta. McClelland moved to British Columbia as a driver for a furniture moving company. He served as alderman for Langley from 1969 to 1972. McClelland also worked as a broadcaster for radio station CHQM, as publisher of the Fraser Valley News Herald and as publisher of a monthly country and western music newspaper.

Provincial politics 
In 1973, McClelland ran unsuccessfully for the leadership of the Social Credit party. He later served in the provincial cabinet for Premier Bill Bennett as Minister of Health, as Minister of Energy Mines and Petroleum Resources, as Minister of Labour and as Minister of Industry and Small Business Development.

McClelland earned the nickname "Broadway Bob" from his opponents after a controversy arose in 1982 about a taxpayer-paid visit in 1980 to New York City that included tickets to a burlesque Broadway musical and costs for keeping a limousine chauffeur on standby for 10 hours at Plaza Hotel.

The Top Hat Affair 
On the night of Feb. 26, 1985, the day before he was transferred from Labour ministry to Industry and Small Business, McClelland phoned and paid $130 as a customer to Top Hat Productions, a Victoria-based escort service that was under surveillance by police. On Nov. 27, 1987, McClelland was called by the defence to testify in the criminal trial of Top Hat's operator, Arlie Blakely, who faced 19 counts of prostitution-related offences. McClelland testified that he had drunk too much alcohol that night to retain memory of everything that happened. The issue became known as The Top Hat Affair. McClelland retained his cabinet position until July 1986 after Bill Vander Zalm became the new leader of his political party. He did not seek re-election.

References 

1933 births
British Columbia Social Credit Party MLAs
Canadian radio personalities
Health ministers of British Columbia
British Columbia municipal councillors
People from Langley, British Columbia (city)
Living people
Members of the Executive Council of British Columbia
Politicians from Calgary
20th-century Canadian newspaper publishers (people)